Chamaesphecia empiformis is a moth of the family Sesiidae. It is found in Europe. It strongly resembles Chamaesphecia tenthrediniformis, some sources classify both as one species.

The length of the forewings is 6–10 mm. The moth flies from May to August depending on the location.

The larvae feed on cypress spurge.

External links

Vlindernet 
waarneming.nl 
Lepidoptera of Belgium

Sesiidae
Moths described in 1783
Moths of Europe